Ottava may refer to:

 Ottava rima, an Italian rhyming stanza.
 In music, an octave. Particularly in the following musical instructions:
 All' ottava alta (8va, also ottava sopra), transpose music up one octave
 All' ottava bassa (8vb, also ottava sotta), transpose music down one octave
 Coll' ottava, double at the octave

See also
Otava (disambiguation)